The Night Before the Divorce is a 1942 American comedy film directed by Robert Siodmak and starring Lynn Bari, Mary Beth Hughes and Joseph Allen, adapted from the 1937 play of the same name by Gina Kaus and Ladislas Fodor.

Main cast
 Lynn Bari as Lynn Nordyke
 Mary Beth Hughes as Lola May
 Joseph Allen as George Nordyke (as Joseph Allen Jr.)
 Nils Asther as Victor Roselle
 Truman Bradley as Inspector Bruce Campbell
 Kay Linaker as Hedda Smythe
 Lyle Latell as Detective Brady
 Mary Treen as Olga - the Maid
 Thurston Hall as Bert 'Mousey' Harriman
 Spencer Charters as Small Town Judge
 Leon Belasco as Leo - the Headwaiter
 Tom Fadden as Captain Walt
 Alec Craig as Jitters Noonan

References

Bibliography
 Alpi, Deborah Lazaroff. Robert Siodmak: A Biography. McFarland, 1998.
 Greco, Joseph. The File on Robert Siodmak in Hollywood, 1941-1951. Universal-Publishers, 1999.

External links
 

1942 films
1942 comedy films
1940s English-language films
American comedy films
Films directed by Robert Siodmak
Films scored by Leigh Harline
American films based on plays
Films based on Austrian novels
Films based on adaptations
20th Century Fox films
American black-and-white films
1940s American films